The Portrait may refer to:

 The Portrait (Magritte), a 1935 painting by René Magritte
 "The Portrait" (short story), an 1835 short story by Nikolai Gogol
 The Portrait (opera), a 1983 opera composed by Mieczysław Weinberg based on the short story
 "The Portrait" (song), a song by The Damned on their 1986 album Anything
 The Portrait (1915 film)
 The Portrait (1923 film), an Austrian-French silent film directed by Jacques Feyder 
 The Portrait (1993 film), starring Gregory Peck and Lauren Bacall
 Ang Larawan, also known as The Portrait, a 2017 Philippine musical film

See also
 Portrait (disambiguation)
 The Portrait of a Lady (disambiguation)